Stefan Antoni Mdzewski, O.P. (1653–1718) was a Roman Catholic prelate who served as  Auxiliary Bishop of Gniezno (1699–1718) and Auxiliary Bishop of Lutsk (1690-1699).

Biography
Stefan Antoni Mdzewski was born in Plock in 1653 and ordained a priest in the Order of Preachers on 2 May 1671. On 11 Jan 1690, he was appointed during the papacy of Pope Alexander VIII as Auxiliary Bishop of Lutsk and Titular Bishop of Calama. On 12 Mar 1690, he was consecrated bishop by Bogusław Leszczyński (bishop), Bishop of Lutsk, with Andrzej Chryzostom Załuski, Bishop of Kyiv and Chernihiv, serving as co-consecrator. On 13 Aug 1699, he was appointed during the papacy of Pope Innocent XII as Auxiliary Bishop of Gniezno. He served as Auxiliary Bishop of Gniezno until his death on 16 May 1718.

Episcopal succession
While bishop, he was the principal co-consecrator of:
Kazimierz Jan Szczuka, Bishop of Chelmno (1693);
Kazimierz Łubieński, Auxiliary Bishop of Kraków (1701);
Aleksander Benedykt Wyhowski, Bishop of Lutsk (1703); and
Jan Mikolaj Łubieniecki, Bishop of Bacău (1711).

References

External links and additional sources
 (for Chronology of Bishops) 
 (for Chronology of Bishops)  

17th-century Roman Catholic bishops in the Polish–Lithuanian Commonwealth
18th-century Roman Catholic bishops in the Polish–Lithuanian Commonwealth
Bishops appointed by Pope Alexander VIII
Bishops appointed by Pope Innocent XII
1653 births
1718 deaths
Dominican bishops